Özer Özdemir (born 5 February 1998) is a Turkish professional footballer who plays as a right-back for Denizlispor.

Club career
Özdemir made his professional debut for Le Havre AC in a 4–1 Ligue 2 win over AJ Auxerre on 4 August 2017. On 22 November 2017, he signed his first professional contract with Auxerre for 3 seasons. On 5 July 2019, he transferred to Turkey in the Süper Lig with Yeni Malatyaspor. The following season, he transferred to the newly promoted side Denizlispor where he played as a starter.

International career
Özdemir was born in France and is of Turkish descent. He is a youth international for Turkey.

Youth career
 French U19 championship finalist: 2016–17

References

External links

1998 births
Living people
People from Montivilliers
Sportspeople from Seine-Maritime
Association football fullbacks
Turkish footballers
Turkey youth international footballers
French footballers
French people of Turkish descent
Le Havre AC players
Yeni Malatyaspor footballers
Denizlispor footballers
Ligue 2 players
Süper Lig players
Footballers from Normandy